Robert Hardman (born 1965) is a British journalist, author, and documentary filmmaker best known for his work on the British Royal family.

Biography
Hardman was born in 1965. He was educated at Wellington College and the University of Cambridge.

Hardman has been a columnist and royal correspondent for the Daily Telegraph and, since 2001, writes for the Daily Mail.

He is married, with three children, and lives in London.

Selected filmography
The Queen's Castle (BBC1, 2005); 
Monarchy: The Royal Family At Work (BBC1, 2007); 
Charles at 60 (BBC1, 2008);
The Duke: A Portrait of Prince Philip (ITV, 2008);
Our Queen (ITV, 2013); 
Our Queen at Ninety (ITV, 2016); 
George III – The Genius of the Mad King (BBC2, 2017); 
Queen of the World (ITV, 2018); 
Anne – The Princess Royal At 70 (ITV 2020)PublicationsMonarchy – The Royal Family At Work. Ebury, 2007 ; Our Queen. Arrow, 2012 ; Queen of the World. Century, 2018 Queen of Our Times: The Life of Elizabeth II''. Macmillan, 2022

References

1965 births
Living people
British journalists
British non-fiction writers
People educated at Wellington College, Berkshire
Alumni of the University of Cambridge
The Daily Telegraph people
Daily Mail journalists